Listed below are the dates and results for the 1982 FIFA World Cup qualification rounds for the African zone (CAF). For an overview of the qualification rounds, see the article 1982 FIFA World Cup qualification.

A total of 29 CAF teams entered the competition. However, Central African Republic was excluded by FIFA for not paying the entry fee. The African Zone was allocated 2 places (out of 24) in the final tournament. Finally 26 nations played at least one of the 46 games.

Format
There would be four rounds of play:
 First Round: 4 teams, Sudan, Liberia, Togo, and Zimbabwe, received byes and advanced to the Second Round directly. The remaining 24 teams were paired up to play knockout matches on a home-and-away basis. The winners would advance to the Second Round. Ghana and Uganda withdrew before playing.
 Second Round and Third Round: In each of these rounds, the teams were paired up to play knockout matches on a home-and-away basis. The winners would advance to the next round. Libya withdrew before playing the Second round.
 Final Round: The 4 teams were paired up to play knockout matches on a home-and-away basis. The winners would qualify.

First round

|}

Morocco won 1–0 on agg. and advanced to the Second Round.

Zaire won 7–3 on agg. and advanced to the Second Round.

Cameroon won 4–1 on agg. and advanced to the Second Round.

Guinea won 4–2 on agg. and advanced to the Second Round.

Nigeria won on penalties after 2–2 on agg. and so advanced to the Second Round.

Libya won 2–1 on agg. and advanced to the Second Round.

Zambia won 4–0 on agg. and advanced to the Second Round.

Niger advanced to the Second Round due on away goals after 1–1 on agg.

Algeria won 5–3 on agg. and advanced to the Second Round.

Tanzania won 6–3 on agg. and advanced to the Second Round.

Egypt advanced to the Second Round, Ghana withdrew.

Madagascar advanced to the Second Round, Uganda withdrew.

Second round

|}

Algeria won 3–1 on agg. and advanced to the Third Round.

Niger advanced to the Third Round due on away goals after a draw 2–2 on agg.

Guinea won 1–0 on agg. and advanced to the Third Round.

Cameroon won 2–1 on agg. and advanced to the Third Round.

Morocco won on penalties after a draw 2–2 on agg. and advanced to the Third Round.

Nigeria won 3–1 on agg. and advanced to the Third Round.

Zaire won 4–3 on agg. and advanced to the Third Round.

Egypt advanced to the Third Round, Libya withdrew.

Third round

|}

Algeria won 4–1 on agg. and advanced to the Final Round.

Nigeria won 2–1 on agg. and advanced to the Final Round.

Morocco won 1–0 on agg. and advanced to the Final Round.

Cameroon won 6–2 on agg. and advanced to the Final Round.

Final round

|}

Algeria won 4–1 on agg. and qualified for the 1982 FIFA World Cup.

Cameroon won 4–1 on agg. and qualified for the 1982 FIFA World Cup.

Qualified teams

1 Bold indicates champions for that year. Italic indicates hosts for that year.

Goalscorers

6 goals

 Roger Milla

5 goals

 Lakhdar Belloumi

3 goals

 Tedj Bensaoula
 Rabah Madjer
 Emmanuel Kundé
 Thuwein Ali
 Muteba N'Daye

2 goals

 Ali Fergani
 Grégoire Mbida
 Jean Manga Onguéné
 Amara Touré
 Sammy Owino
 Gil Guiambe
 John Chiedozie
 Peter Tino
 Imowa Malgbanga
 Ayel Mayélé
 Kiyika Tokodi
 Godfrey Chitalu

1 goal

 Rabah Gamouh
 Nourredine Kourichi
 Djamel Zidane
 Théophile Abega
 Ibrahim Aoudou
 Jean-Pierre Tokoto
 Assan Sarr
 Seydouba Bangoura
 Naby Laye Camara
 Mory Koné
 Ibrahima Sory Touré
 Elly Adero
 Sele Leboela
 Teboho Masia
 Abubaker Bani
 Rashid Mohammed Rashid
 Abdou Bin Amidou
 Michel Kira
 Stock Dandize
 Mohamed Boussati
 Abdelaziz Daidi
 Ahmed Limane
 Mohamed Timoumi
 Mustapha Yaghcha
 Francisco Rui Marcos
 Bernard Akue Adovi
 Atcha
 Moussa Kanfideni
 Abou Seydou
 Leotis Boateng
 Mudashiru Lawal
 Christian M'Wokozhi
 Henry Nwosu
 Emmanuel Osigwe
 Felix Owolabi
 Ismael Dyfan
 Sentu Johnson
 Akie Noah
 Ismail Mohammed Sharif
 Abu Obeida Adam
 Mohammed Adolf Rishard
 Mohammed Salim
 Djogou Akoulassi
 Saibi Eklou Dodji
 Témime Lahzami
 Néjib Liman
 Masengo Ilunga
 Tshilumba Mukendi
 Monduone N'Kama
 M'Peti Suzeti
 Alex Chola
 Pele Kaimana
 Emmanuel Musonda
 Bizwell Phiri
 David Muchineripi

1 own goal

 Kuliwa Tshikalu (playing against Madagascar)

See also
1982 FIFA World Cup qualification (UEFA)
1982 FIFA World Cup qualification (CONMEBOL)
1982 FIFA World Cup qualification (CONCACAF)
1982 FIFA World Cup qualification (AFC and OFC)

External links
1982 FIFA World Cup qualification (Zone Africa) - fifa.com
1982 FIFA World Cup qualification details (Zone Africa) - rsssf.com

CAF
FIFA World Cup qualification (CAF)
Qual
Qual